Jeddo Township is an inactive township in Knox County, in the U.S. state of Missouri.

Jeddo Township was established in 1859, taking its name from the community of Jeddo, Missouri.

References

Townships in Missouri
Townships in Knox County, Missouri